Patrizia Cavalli (17 April 1947 – 21 June 2022) was an Italian poet.

Biography
Cavalli defended a thesis devoted to the aesthetics of music. Although most of her work was poetic, she also translated the works of Molière and Shakespeare into Italian. In 1968, she began living in Rome. In 1999, she won the Viareggio Prize for poetry for her work Sempre aperto teatro. In 2019, she was the recipient of the Premio Campiello for Con passi giapponesi.

Patrizia Cavalli died in Rome on 21 June 2022 at the age of 75.

Works
 Le mie poesie non cambieranno il mondo (1974)
 Il cielo (1981)
 Poesie 1974-1992 (1992)
 L'io singolare proprio mio (1999)
 Sempre aperto teatro (1999)
 La Guardania (2004)
 Pigra divinità e pigra sorte (2006)
 La Patria (2011)

References

1947 births
2022 deaths
Italian women poets
20th-century Italian poets
20th-century Italian women writers
21st-century Italian poets
21st-century Italian women writers
Italian LGBT poets
People from Todi